Marcelo Villaça Casares (born 14 December 1994) is a Spanish footballer who plays for Xerez Deportivo FC mainly as a left back.

Club career
Born in Jerez de la Frontera, Cádiz, Andalusia, Marcelo graduated from Xerez CD's youth system, and made his senior debuts with the reserves in the 2012–13 campaign in the Tercera División. On 30 March 2013 he played his first match as a professional, coming on as a second half substitute in a 0–4 away defeat against CD Lugo in the Segunda División.

Marcelo appeared in three further matches for the Andalusians, which were relegated after finishing dead last. On 16 August 2013 he moved to Levante UD, being assigned to the B-team in the Segunda División B.

On 12 January 2015 Marcelo rescinded his link with the Granotes, and signed for CF Pobla de Mafumet a day after. On 17 July 2016 he moved to third-tier club Atlético Sanluqueño CF.

References

External links
Levante official profile 

1994 births
Living people
Footballers from Jerez de la Frontera
Spanish footballers
Association football defenders
Segunda División players
Segunda División B players
Tercera División players
Xerez CD B players
Xerez CD footballers
Atlético Levante UD players
CF Pobla de Mafumet footballers
Atlético Sanluqueño CF players